Colosseum is the second studio album by Shockabilly, released in 1984 by Rough Trade Records. It released on CD as The Ghost of Shockabilly in 1989.

Track listing

Personnel
Adapted from the Colosseum liner notes.

Shockabilly
 Eugene Chadbourne – vocals, electric guitar
 Kramer – vocals, organ, tape, production, engineering
 David Licht – percussion

Production and additional personnel
 Juan Maciel – recording

Release history

References 

1984 albums
Shockabilly albums
Albums produced by Kramer (musician)
Rough Trade Records albums